Anabasis zhengi is a species of snout moth. It was described by L.X. Li and H.H. Li in 2011. It is found in China (Yunnan).

References

Moths described in 2011
Phycitinae